Judsonia is a city in White County, Arkansas, United States. Stan Robinson is the current mayor. The population was 2,019 at the 2010 census.

Geography

Demographics

2020 census

As of the 2020 United States census, there were 1,854 people, 775 households, and 468 families residing in the city.

2000 census
At the 2000 census, there were 1,982 people, 733 households and 529 families residing in the city. The racial makeup was 94.05% White, 2.32% Black or African American, 0.71% Native American, 0.10% Asian, 0.05% Pacific Islander, 1.31% from other races, and 1.46% from two or more races.  2.32% of the population were Hispanic or Latino of any race.

There were 733 households, of which 29.9% had children under the age of 18 living with them, 56.8% were married couples living together, 10.9% had a female householder with no husband present, and 27.7% were non-families. 25.2% of all households were made up of individuals, and 12.7% had someone living alone who was 65 years of age or older. The average household size was 2.48 and the average family size was 2.94.

22.5% of the population were under the age of 18, 7.7% from 18 to 24, 24.9% from 25 to 44, 22.4% from 45 to 64, and 22.6% who were 65 years of age or older.  The median age was 40 years. For every 100 females, there were 85.2 males. For every 100 females age 18 and over, there were 80.5 males.

The median household income was $25,660 and the median family income was $31,176. Males had a median income of $25,774 and females $16,852. The per capita income was $11,891. About 12.0% of families and 15.7% of the population were below the poverty line, including 18.4% of those under age 18 and 20.8% of those age 65 or over.

History
Originally known as Prospect Bluff, the town was founded in 1840 by Erastus Gregory. In 1871, a Baptist school, Judson University, was established in the area. A few months later, the name Prospect Bluff was changed to Judsonia, after the Baptist missionary Adoniram Judson, to help promote the school, which drew many northerners to the area.

Though the school closed in 1883, the town streets still bear the names of several well-known 19th-century Baptists: Judson and Hasseltine (after Adoniram Judson and his wife, Ann Hasseltine Judson), Wayland (after Francis Wayland, president of Brown University in Rhode Island), Wade (after the missionary Jonathan Wade) and Boardman (after the missionary George Boardman, whose widow, Sarah Hall Boardman became Judson's second wife).

On the evening of March 21, 1952, tornadoes swept Arkansas leaving 111 dead. Fifty of those fatalities were in Judsonia and the near vicinity. It was reported that the only building in the town not damaged was the Methodist church, which is in the city's downtown area along Van Buren Street.

That's Judsonia by William Ewing Orr (1957, White County Printing Company) is a history of the community. Judsonia has a yearly festival called Prospect Bluff Days in honor of the towns origins.

Education 
Elementary and secondary education is provided by two school districts:
 Most of the city is within the Riverview School District, including Riverview Junior High School and Riverview High School in Searcy. Judsonia Elementary School is a part of this district. The Riverview district is the result of a consolidation, effective from July 1, 1991, of the Judsonia, Kensett and Griffithville school districts.
 A small section of the city is within the White County Central School District, where students attend White County Central High School; Both are located in a nearby unincorporated area near the Providence community.

Judsonia residents are served by Baldwin-Kittler Memorial Library, a branch library of the White County Regional Library System.

Notable people
 Beth Ditto, musician who grew up in Judsonia
 Jeremy Gillam, farmer from Judsonia and Republican member of the Arkansas House of Representatives
 Lonnie Glosson, an early blues harmonica player

References

 
Cities in Arkansas
Cities in White County, Arkansas
Populated places established in 1840